Ben Uretsky is the cofounder and former chief executive officer (CEO) of DigitalOcean, a cloud infrastructure provider.

In 2003 Uretsky founded his first company ServerStack, a managed hosting provider, with his brother Moisey Uretsky. The company was a precursor to DigitalOcean. Prior to starting ServerStack, Uretsky worked for another managed hosting company called Like Whoa.

In 2011, Uretsky founded DigitalOcean with his brother and another cofounder, Mitch Wainer. In 2012, Uretsky and the other cofounders graduated from the Techstars incubator program in Boulder, Colorado. They launched the first version of DigitalOcean’s product the same year.

In June 2018, Uretsky stepped down as CEO of DigitalOcean and was succeeded by former Citrix CEO Mark Templeton. He remained on the company’s board.

Uretsky’s family immigrated to the U.S. from Russia when he was five. He grew up in Brighton Beach, Brooklyn and attended Stuyvesant High School.

References 

1980s births
21st-century American businesspeople
Businesspeople from New York City
Living people
People from Brighton Beach
Russian emigrants to the United States
Stuyvesant High School alumni
Russian businesspeople in the United States